Prosiccia is a genus of moths in the family Erebidae.

Species
Prosiccia albescens (Rothschild, 1912)
Prosiccia trifasciata Gaede, 1925

References

Natural History Museum Lepidoptera generic names catalog

Nudariina
Moth genera